WYTC-LP (89.1 FM) is a radio station licensed to Hyde Park, Vermont, United States. The station is owned by Union High School District #18.

89.1 FM is run by Lamoille Union Middle and High school students. The studio is located in the Green Mountain Technical and Career Center.

References

External links
 

YTC-LP
YTC-LP
Hyde Park (town), Vermont
High school radio stations in the United States